Karpagam 1963 Indian film.

Karpagam may also refer to:

 Karpagam Academy of Higher Education
 Karpagam College of Engineering
 Karpagam Vanthachu, a 1993 film
 Karpagam Institute of Technology, Coimbatore